Carmen is a 1913 silent film short directed by Stanner E. V. Taylor and starring Marion Leonard. it was produced and distributed by Monopol Film Company.

Cast
Marion Leonard – Carmen
Francis McDonald – Don José

References

External links
 Carmen at IMDb.com
Lobby poster

1913 short films
American black-and-white films
Silent American drama films
1913 drama films
American silent short films
1913 films
Films based on Carmen
Films directed by Stanner E. V. Taylor
1910s American films
1910s English-language films
American drama short films